Gawler Bypass is a major north–south route in the outer northern suburbs of the city of Adelaide, South Australia, connecting Main North Road to the Sturt Highway, bypassing Gawler. The route was built in 1963 in an attempt to redirect traffic on the national highway out of Gawler town centre and has been upgraded and realigned several times since then.

History
The first Gawler bypass was planned in the 1950s and built as a single two-lane carriageway around the town in 1963 with at-grade intersections and carried 3,000 vehicles per day. It ended at a tee-junction with Main North Road at the southern end, and followed an alignment that included what is now the southbound on-ramp and Brereton Road, Jack Cooper Drive over the Winckel Bridge, and Paternoster Drive to the railway bridge.

The road was rebuilt in the mid-1980s as a dual carriageway with grade-separated intersections at the southern end in a new alignment, with new bridges over the Gawler River. At the time of approval, the bypass was carrying 7000 vehicles per day, and 300 collisions had been recorded between 1977 and 1982; it commenced construction at the end of 1985. Its total cost was $18 million, of which $13 million came from Federal funding.

Construction of Northern Expressway in 2010 resulted in realignment of the northbound carriageway as part of creating a grade-separated intersection with smooth flow between the northern section of the bypass and both the Northern Expressway and the southern part of the bypass. As both roads lead broadly south, there is no provision to turn directly from one to the other. Road definitions also changed: the definition of Sturt Highway was lengthened a short distance west along the bypass to meet the expressway, resulting in a shortening of the bypass by a distance of 3.5km.

It was designated National Route 20, updated to National Highway 20 in 1992, and to National Highway A20 in 1998; this was changed to route A52 south of the intersection with Northern Expressway when it opened in 2010. From late 2016, the entire length was re-designated route A20, with the Northern Expressway being re-designated route M2 (instead of route M20).

Exits and interchanges

See also

References

Highways in South Australia
Roads in Adelaide
Freeways and highways in Adelaide
Gawler, South Australia
Bypasses in Australia